For Once in My Life is an album by Tony Bennett, released in December 1967. The album reached a peak position of number 164 on the Billboard 200 charts.

Track listing
"They Can't Take That Away from Me" (George Gershwin, Ira Gershwin) - 2:45
"Something in Your Smile" (Leslie Bricusse) - 2:25
"Days of Love" (Paul Francis Webster, David Rose) - 2:21
"Broadway Medley: Broadway / Crazy Rhythm / Lullaby of Broadway" - 2:40
"For Once in My Life" (Ron Miller, Orlando Murden) - 3:20
"Sometimes I'm Happy" (Vincent Youmans, Irving Caesar) - 2:23
"Out of This World" (Harold Arlen, Johnny Mercer) - 3:08
"Baby, Dream Your Dream" (Cy Coleman, Dorothy Fields) - 1:58
"How Do You Say Auf Wiedersehn" (Johnny Mercer, Anthony James Scibetta) - 3:14
"Keep Smiling at Trouble" (Buddy DeSylva, Al Jolson, Lewis Gensler) - 3:01

References

1967 albums
Tony Bennett albums
Columbia Records albums